Alan Lakein was an American author on personal time management, including How to Get Control of Your Time and Your Life which has sold over 3 million copies.

Lakein graduated from Johns Hopkins University and Harvard Business School and  resided in Santa Cruz, California.

Lakein is credited for several quotes, including "Time = Life, Therefore, waste your time and waste your life, or master your time and master your life." He is credited as the creator of Lakein's question: "What is the best use of my time right now?".  He has also made management films and training films.

Former U.S. President Bill Clinton started his autobiography, "My Life", with a reference to the book:

Books
 Alan Lakein, How to Get Control of Your Time and Your Life (1973, New American Library, New York City)
 Alan Lakein, Give Me a Moment and I'll Change Your Life: Tools for Moment Management (1997 Andrews & McMeel, Kansas City, MO)
 It's About Time & It's About Time (1975)

References

External links

American self-help writers
Living people
Harvard Business School alumni
Johns Hopkins University alumni
Year of birth missing (living people)